Route 144 is a  Canadian secondary highway in northwest New Brunswick.

The route's western terminus is Route 2 (Trans-Canada Highway) at Saint-Jacques. From there, it runs in a southeast direction, flanked by Route 2 to the north and the United States border with the state of Maine to the south. Its eastern terminus is at Route 108 in Grand Falls. Route 144 is the original alignment of Route 2.

See also
List of New Brunswick provincial highways

References

144
144
Grand Falls, New Brunswick
Transport in Edmundston
Former segments of the Trans-Canada Highway